Howard Leroy Morton (May 15, 1925 – May 11, 1997) was an American actor.

Career
Morton was best known for playing dim-witted police officer Ralph Waldo Simpson on Gimme a Break! for five seasons (1981–86). He appeared in many TV supporting roles on sitcoms including The Bill Cosby Show, All in the Family, The Jeffersons, I Dream of Jeannie, Good Times, Mary Hartman, Mary Hartman, and Brian Henley in My Favorite Martian. He also played Grandpa in The Munsters Today from 1988 to 1991.

Morton made a number of appearances on game shows, including Super Password and Pyramid. He also appeared in many feature films, making his debut in The Mechanic (1972) and appeared on stage in productions of Auntie Mame, Morning's at Seven, and Fancy Meeting You Again.

Personal life
Morton never married nor had any children.

Born in New York City, Morton moved to Hollywood in 1960 to pursue his acting career.

He died of complications of a stroke on May 11, 1997, at Providence Saint Joseph Medical Center in Burbank, just four days shy of his 72nd birthday. A memorial service was held at the North Hollywood Church of Religious Science.

Partial filmography

External links

References

1925 births
1997 deaths
American male television actors
Male actors from New York City
20th-century American male actors